The Ice Box is a 3,500-seat multi-purpose arena in Lincoln, Nebraska. It was adapted for hockey upon the Lincoln Stars' arrival in 1996. The Ice Box is located at 1800 State Fair Park Drive, on the former Nebraska State Fair grounds. The arena and fairgrounds existed simultaneously until the latter was bought and torn down by the University of Nebraska–Lincoln in 2010.

External links
Lincoln Stars: Ice Box

Indoor arenas in Nebraska
Indoor ice hockey venues in the United States
Sports venues in Nebraska
Sports in Lincoln, Nebraska
Buildings and structures in Lincoln, Nebraska
Tourist attractions in Lincoln, Nebraska
1951 establishments in Nebraska
Sports venues completed in 1951